Bobo Karl Nils Sollander Jansson (born 26 June 1985), known simply as Bobo Sollander, is a retired Swedish footballer who played as a defender.

He is the grandson of Stig Sollander.

Career statistics

Club

Notes

References

External links
 
 
 Bobo Sollander at fotbolltransfers
 Bobo Sollander at elitefootball

1985 births
Living people
Swedish footballers
Association football defenders
Östersunds FK players
Allsvenskan players
Superettan players
Ettan Fotboll players
Division 2 (Swedish football) players
Division 3 (Swedish football) players
Place of birth missing (living people)